Gérard Annequin (born 15 December 1948) is a French former racing cyclist. He won the tour of Guadeloupe in 1971.

References

1948 births
Living people
French male cyclists
Place of birth missing (living people)
20th-century French people